Carmet may refer to:
Jean Carmet (1920–1995), French actor
Carmet, California, census-designated place